Jean Bourgogne was a French entomologist . He was born on 14 February 1903 in Marseille and died on 10 March 1999 in Neuilly-sur-Seine.

In 1936 he began to work in the entomology laboratory of the Muséum national d'histoire naturelle of Paris. He became a member of the Société entomologique de France in 1935. He specialized in the study of the Lepidoptera Psychidae. In 1959 he created the entomological publication Alexanor. He published 221 works. He donated his collection to the entomology laboratory of the Muséum national d'histoire naturelle of Paris.

Species named after Jean Bourgogne 
 Agrilus bourgognei Descarpentries & Villiers, 1963
 Antiophlebia bourgognei Laporte, 1975
 Apisa bourgognei Kiriakoff, 1952
 Bergeria bourgognei Kiriakoff, 1952
 Catoptria conchella bourgognei Leraut, 2001
 Elophila bourgognei Leraut, 2001
 Metasia cuencalis bourgognei Leraut, 2001
 Pyrgus bourgognei Picard, 1948
 Roseala bourgognei Viette, 1950
 Sericochroa bourgognei Thiaucourt, 2003

List of taxa described 
The list of 74 new names which he created is published on the web.

References

French lepidopterists
1903 births
1999 deaths
Scientists from Marseille
20th-century French zoologists
National Museum of Natural History (France) people